Bogo de Clare (21 July 1248 – October 1294) was a member of the Anglo-Norman de Clare family, as third son of Richard de Clare (1222–1262), 5th Earl of Hertford and 6th Earl of Gloucester. He was the brother of Gilbert and Thomas. By all accounts he was not a good man.

Early life
As the earl's third son, he was destined for the Church. At the tender age of eleven Bogo was appointed Dean of Stafford.

Pluralist
Through his father's influence, and that of his brother and their friends, and even King Henry III ("who should have known better") he became Chancellor of Llandaff, Treasurer of York Minster (see also Treasurer's House, York) and the rector of at least 20 clerical livings. Despite a 1283 order from William de Wickwane, Archbishop of York (died 1285), there is no evidence that he was ever ordained priest. 

In June 1282 in a highly critical letter, Archbishop Peckham had accused Bogo of being a ravisher (raptor) of churches rather than a rector. "At that time lord Bogo de Clare had powerfully interfered with the proceeds of the York treasury; to whom the lord archbishop opposed himself with all his strength; at last, I do not know how, the storm completely calmed down." (Ann. mon., 4.305) 

Some years before his death he became the owner of Tregrug Castle, near the village of Llangybi, in Monmouthshire.

He died suddenly in October 1294 ("before the Feast of All Saints"), his passing noticed by several chroniclers, always unfavourably. The Worcester annalist commented that "God only knows if his life was worthy of praise, but no-one thought it worthy of imitation." (Ann. mon., 4.517)."

References

1248 births
1294 deaths
13th-century English people
Younger sons of earls